Sahatavy is a town and commune in Madagascar. It belongs to the district of Vavatenina, which is a part of Analanjirofo Region in Toamasina Province. 
 
The population of the commune was estimated to be approximately 16,334 inhabitants in 2018.

Primary and junior level secondary education are available in town. The majority 95% of the population of the commune are farmers.  The most important crop is rice, while other important products are coffee and cloves.  Services provide employment for 5% of the population.

Rivers
It lies at the river with the same name: Sahatavy River.

References and notes 

Populated places in Analanjirofo